Mohamad Ashmawi bin Md. Yakin (born 1 January 1994) is a Malaysian footballer who plays for Malaysia M3 League club Immigration as a defender.

Club career

Early year
Born in Seremban, Negeri Sembilan, Ashmawi began his football career playing for Bukit Jalil Sports School team in 2011 at the age of 17, before been discovered by Ong Kim Swee to play in Harimau Muda B at the age 19.

Negeri Sembilan
After Harimau Muda team been dissolved in 2015, Ashmawi signed two-years contract with his hometown side Negeri Sembilan.

Selangor
On 4 December 2017, Ashmawi signed a one-year contract with Malaysia Super League club Selangor on a free transfer.

Career statistics

Club

International career

Ashmawi was called up to the Malaysia U-16 for 2010 AFC U-16 Championship qualification in 2009.

Honours

Club
TO BE DETERMINED

International
TO BE DETERMINED

References

External links

1996 births
Living people
Malaysian footballers
Selangor FA players
Negeri Sembilan FA players
Malaysia Super League players
Malaysian people of Malay descent
People from Negeri Sembilan
Association football wingers
Association football midfielders